Pedro Luis Lazo Iglesias (born April 15, 1973 in Pinar del Río Province, Cuba) is a top pitcher in  Cuban baseball. He is used predominantly as a reliever in international competition, although he is a starter in the Cuban National Series, where he plays for Pinar del Río. His fastball has been clocked at 97 mph, and he combined it with a mid-80s slider.

Career
Lazo was part of the gold medal-winning Cuban teams at the 1996 Atlanta Olympics and 2004 Athens games, and won silver at the 2000 Sydney and  2008 Beijing Olympics. He also appeared in the exhibition series between the Cuban national team and the Baltimore Orioles in 1999.

During the World Cup of Baseball in 2005 in the Netherlands, Lazo had 2 wins, 0 losses with 2 saves, a 0.54 earned run average, and just 7 hits against in  innings. He also pitched for Cuba in the World Baseball Classic in March 2006 and recorded an impressive 5 inning save against Dominican Republic in the semifinals matchup.

Lazo is the current and active wins leader in the Cuban National Series with 249 wins.

Personal life
His cousin, Raudel Lazo, defected from Cuba to play in Major League Baseball.

References

External links
 

1973 births
Living people
Olympic baseball players of Cuba
Olympic gold medalists for Cuba
Olympic silver medalists for Cuba
Olympic medalists in baseball
Medalists at the 1996 Summer Olympics
Medalists at the 2000 Summer Olympics
Medalists at the 2004 Summer Olympics
Medalists at the 2008 Summer Olympics
Baseball players at the 1996 Summer Olympics
Baseball players at the 2000 Summer Olympics
Baseball players at the 2004 Summer Olympics
Baseball players at the 2008 Summer Olympics
Pan American Games gold medalists for Cuba
Baseball players at the 1995 Pan American Games
Baseball players at the 1999 Pan American Games
Baseball players at the 2007 Pan American Games
2006 World Baseball Classic players
2009 World Baseball Classic players
Pan American Games medalists in baseball
Central American and Caribbean Games gold medalists for Cuba
Competitors at the 1998 Central American and Caribbean Games
Competitors at the 2006 Central American and Caribbean Games
People from Pinar del Río Province
Central American and Caribbean Games medalists in baseball
Medalists at the 1995 Pan American Games
Medalists at the 1999 Pan American Games
Medalists at the 2007 Pan American Games